Bangladesh Television, commonly known by its acronym BTV, is the state-owned television network of Bangladesh. The network was originally established as the East Pakistan branch of PTV in 1964. It is the oldest Bengali-language television network in the world, and is the sister to the radio broadcaster Bangladesh Betar, which, along with BTV, are both owned and operated by the government.

Bangladesh Television is the country's only television network provided on terrestrial television. It is primarily financed through television licence fees. Although it has produced many award-winning programs, it has often been accused of being the mouth piece of the government and their lack of quality programming. Both the headquarters and the administrative building of Bangladesh Television are located at Rampura in Dhaka.

Prior to the late 1990s, Bangladesh Television was the sole television broadcaster provided in Bangladesh, and was a very successful network in terms of viewership until the launch of several satellite television channels, which led to the network's downfall and stagnation, mostly due to the fact that it was used for spewing government propaganda ever since Bangladesh's independence.

It operates two main television stations, BTV Dhaka and BTV Chittagong, and fourteen relay stations all over Bangladesh, along with a satellite television channel, BTV World. It is a member of the Asia-Pacific Broadcasting Union and Asiavision, and is an associate member of the European Broadcasting Union. Bangladesh Television also plans to launch six more television channels.

BTV can be received via satellite throughout Asia and parts of Europe and Africa. Bangladesh Television is also the sister network of Sangsad Television, a parliamentary television channel. BTV World is also to be converted into an independent entertainment television channel with a different schedule compared to BTV Dhaka. BTV Dhaka broadcasts eighteen hours a day on terrestrial television, and twenty-four hours a day on satellite television. Its satellite feed relays BTV World's transmissions during the off-air hours of its terrestrial feed. BTV Chittagong broadcasts on a full-day basis daily.

History

1964–1971: Pakistan Television era 

BTV first commenced transmissions on 25 December 1964 at 19:00 (Dhaka Standard Time), as a pilot project in the then East Pakistan under the name, Pilot Television Dhaka, airing a song titled "Oi Je Akash Nil Holo Akash", sang by singer Ferdausi Rahman. It broadcast from the DIT Bhaban on a four-hour basis, with broadcasting equipments provided by NEC. After three months on the air, it was officially converted into a service of Pakistan Television.

This was Pakistan Television's second television station after the one in Lahore. The first drama telecast on PTV's Dacca television station, Ektala Dotala, written by Munier Choudhury, was aired in 1965. Reality television series Notun Kuri premiered on the station in 1966. It was later taken off the air, although the series would return to the air in 1976. The first television commercial on PTV Dacca was aired in 1967 for a detergent soap 707. The same year, Pakistan Television's eastern branch was converted to an autonomous corporation.

On 4 March 1971, the Dhaka station of Pakistan Television was unofficially renamed to "Dhaka Television", and television celebrities refused to work for Pakistani television as the East Pakistanis struggle for autonomy. When Bangladesh was declared an independent state on 23 March 1971, television began showing the flag of Bangladesh and playing the Bangladeshi national anthem, Amar Sonar Bangla, rather than the Pakistani flag and national anthem. 

Threats were made by Pakistani authorities that if the flag of Pakistan was not displayed on television, then Bengali workers will be barred from entering the television center. However, pro-Bangladesh songs were aired on Dhaka Television during the night of 23 March instead. As a result, the Pakistan Armed Forces took control of the DIT Bhaban, but was attacked by the Mukti Bahini. At that moment, people joined to fight for the liberation of Bangladesh through its television industry.

1971–1997: Independence and government monopoly 

After the independence of Bangladesh in 1971, Pakistan Television's Dacca television station was renamed to Bangladesh Television, officially losing its affiliation with PTV. Bangladesh Television's logo appeared on the television screen for the first time on 17 December 1971. The next year, the autonomous corporation was converted into a fully government-owned department on 15 September. The network established its first relay station in Natore in 1974.

In 1975, the offices and studios were shifted to the newly built headquarters located at Rampura in Dhaka with newer technology. In 1977, Fazle Lohani created a new magazine show for BTV based on The David Frost Show on BBC, Jodi Kichhu Mone Na Koren, which ended right after his death. Bangladesh Television commenced color transmissions in December 1980, marking the first official full-time color broadcasts in South Asia. In 1984, Bangladesh Television merged with Bangladesh Betar to form the National Broadcasting Authority.

As of 1985, via the Satkhira relay station, television sets in West Bengal in India could receive terrestrial signals of BTV. As of 1986, BTV broadcast for 9 hours a weekday and 14 hours on weekends, usually during the evenings. It also aired special programming during Fridays, national and religious holidays. It began relaying broadcasts of CNN and BBC in 1992, marking the first presence of foreign television in Bangladesh. In 1994, BTV telecasted its first private production, a one-hour play Prachir Periye, directed by Atiqul Haque Chowdhury.  The network established its Chittagong station on 19 December 1996.

During the 1980s to 1990s, Bangladesh Television had created several popular television series, such as Ei Shob Din Ratri, Bohubrihi, Ayomoy, Ityadi,  Kothao Keu Nei, Aaj Robibar, and many others. It has also aired several foreign television series, such as Alif Laila and The Sword of Tipu Sultan, which helped with the network's success. The era from the 1980s to the year 2000 was often called the "golden age" of Bangladesh Television. In May 1997, Bangladesh Television received an Asiavision Award for its coverage of the cyclone that occurred in that year.

1997–2018: Decline of BTV and rise of private television 
Bangladesh Television was the sole television broadcaster in Bangladesh until the launch of ATN Bangla on satellite television in 1997, and Ekushey Television on terrestrial in 2000. As competition grew over the years, BTV declined and stagnated, and privately owned television channels gained more popularity among locals. 

A 2017 survey by the Bangladesh Cable TV Viewers Forum stated that only around 25% to 30% of the cable television audience watch local television, among them BTV gained the lowest viewership (1.2% of the audience watched BTV), and was mostly watched by rural audiences, who only have access to terrestrial television. The network's director general, Haroon Or Rashid, once stated that if BTV does not change, it will become 'obsolete'.

However, up to 2003, Bangladesh Television had established fourteen relay stations, covering 93% of the country. In 2004, Bangladesh Television began international satellite broadcasts via BTV World. In April 2005, the Bangladeshi adaptation of Sesame Street, Sisimpur, debuted on BTV, which still airs the series as of today. Due to a power outage caused by the North Indian Ocean cyclone on 17 November 2007, BTV temporarily ceased transmissions for nearly three hours that day.

A new license office was inaugurated at the headquarters of BTV in 2008, according to a press release. In 2009, the Government of Bangladesh decided to reserve terrestrial television frequencies in the country solely to Bangladesh Television. The BBC World Service developed two television series for BTV, Bishaash and BBC Janala Mojay Mojay Shekha, to promote the English language to Bangladeshi audiences. Both series premiered on the network in October 2010.

Its sister, Sangsad Television, was launched on 25 January 2011, which simultaneously broadcasts live programming from the Jatiya Sangsad Bhaban. On the same day, BTV commenced experimental broadcasts on digital terrestrial television in Dhaka, Chittagong, and Khulna. On 5 November 2012, to compete with privately owned local television channels, BTV began broadcasting for 24 hours via satellite television, while still retaining the 18-hour broadcast on terrestrial.

In June 2014, an unused frequency of BTV was scrapped as it disrupted 3G services of mobile operators in Bangladesh. On 24 June 2014, as lightning struck on the tower of Bangladesh Television's Patuakhali relay station, terrestrial broadcasts from there temporarily halted, as a result of the damages caused by the lightning. BTV, along with GTV and Maasranga Television, broadcast the 2016 Asia Cup. Bangladesh Television opened the country's first television museum on 1 December 2016.

2018–present: Renaissance of Bangladesh Television 
By 2018, Bangladesh Television began regaining its fame and relevancy, after the network reformed its programming, which led to a tremendous increase in viewership. According to Hasanul Haq Inu, the Minister of Information of Bangladesh, around 83% of the country's population watched BTV in that year. BTV, along with Maasranga Television and Nagorik, was the broadcaster of the 2018 FIFA World Cup in Bangladesh. 

The network began broadcasting in India via DD Free Dish on 2 September 2019, via the Bangabandhu-1 satellite. To celebrate BTV's 55th anniversary in 2019, privately owned Channel i organized a special program in its headquarters, which was broadcast on both networks. BTV also inaugurated two new digital studios on 8 February 2020, at the BTV Bhaban, as a part of the network's renaissance.

During the COVID-19 pandemic, BTV, along with Sangsad Television, began broadcasting educational programming for secondary-level students. It had also reaired some of its classic television series. BTV announced to establish an educational channel to make remote learning more effective on students, which was also planned way back in 2008. On 8 February 2021, Sohrab Hossain was appointed as Bangladesh Television's new director general.

On 13 March 2021, Bangladesh Television announced that they will be establishing 6 more regional stations, which will be accomplished by 2023. The network officially launched its app in May 2021, in which four channels, including BTV Dhaka, BTV Chittagong, BTV World, and Sangsad Television, can be streamed worldwide. It also planned to launch its own DTH service soon.

On 24 September 2021, Hasan Mahmud, Information and Broadcasting Minister, formally announced to convert BTV's Khulna station from relay to a full-on regional station, which was supposed to happen on 16 December 2013, but as various broadcasting facilities were brought to Dhaka from the Khulna station, this was postponed. Bangladesh Television inaugurated its high definition broadcasts in its 57th anniversary in 2021. On the same day, a Bangabandhu Corner dedicated to the founding father of Bangladesh, Sheikh Mujibur Rahman, was inaugurated at the headquarters of Bangladesh Television.

In May 2022, the Government of Bangladesh ordered the broadcast of BTV's channels in airports across the country. In October 2022, Bangladesh Television began airing the first 2D animated series fully produced in Bangladesh, Jongole Mongol. In November 2022, with the cost of 980 million BDT, Bangladesh Television gained the rights of airing the 2022 FIFA World Cup held in Qatar.

Television stations 

Bangladesh Television operates two main television stations in Dhaka and Chittagong, of which the station in Dhaka is relayed nationwide via its fourteen relay stations, known as upakendra (উপকেন্দ্র) in Bengali, throughout Bangladesh. About 2 million television sets in the country receives signals from BTV, and covers more than 90% of the Bangladeshi area.

The relay stations are located at Natore, Khulna, Mymensingh, Sylhet, Rangpur, Noakhali, Brahmanbaria, Thakurgaon, Rajshahi, Jhenaidah, Satkhira, Patuakhali, Ukhia, and Rangamati respectfully. The network announced to establish six more regional BTV stations for the rest of Bangladesh's divisions, namely Barisal, Khulna, Mymensingh, Rajshahi, Rangpur, and Sylhet. The first station of BTV outside Dhaka was established in Natore in 1974. It was formerly a regional station airing original programming, but was later converted to a relay station simulcasting programming from BTV's Dhaka station. Later, more relay stations of BTV were established across the country. BTV's first contemporary regional television station was established in Chittagong in 1996.

Main television stations 
 BTV Dhaka or BTV National - The largest and main television station of Bangladesh Television, headquartered in Rampura and mostly branded on-air as 'BTV'. It commenced transmissions for the first time in 1964 as a PTV-affiliated station of Dacca in the then East Pakistan. After Bangladesh's independence, the station was rebranded as BTV, and was the only major station until 1996. It is relayed nationwide via its terrestrial relay stations and BTV's satellite channel, BTV World. BTV Dhaka is a free-to-air television channel.

 BTV Chittagong - BTV's first and currently the sole regional television station, inaugurated in 1996. It began broadcasting on satellite television in 2016 and is the second terrestrial television station of Bangladesh. It broadcasts programming for the Chittagonians and the indigenous peoples of the Chittagong Hill Tracts. BTV Chittagong broadcasts on a full-day basis since 19 December 2021.

Relay television stations

Satellite television 

BTV broadcasts worldwide through satellite television via BTV World. It was launched on 11 April 2004, the same year when BTV itself also began broadcasting in satellite. BTV World broadcasts on a full-day basis, and BTV's satellite feed simulcasts the transmission of BTV World, when the channel closes down for the night, as the terrestrial feed shuts off. BTV broadcasts in over 49 countries via the AsiaSat 7 satellite, covering almost the entire continent of Asia.

In 2016, BTV Chittagong began satellite transmissions with airtime hours increasing over time, which broadcast in 60 countries worldwide. In 2018, Bangladesh Television began broadcasting through the Bangabandhu-1 satellite, along with several other local television channels. Via the Bangabandhu-1 satellite, the network's television signals can be received in the Middle East and North Africa.

Internet 
Bangladesh Television is available on several social media platforms, including Facebook, Twitter, and YouTube. It has also been broadcasting live on IPTV and mobile TV services from 12 November 2013. Bangladesh Television's channels, along with Sangsad Television, are made available for streaming worldwide via the BTV app since May 2021.

Logo 

The logo of Bangladesh Television was created by prominent art director Mohiuddin Faroque in 1971, and is currently in use since then. The logo consists of a 60s style television screen with a red disc and a green line inside, resembling a sunrise. It is one of the most recognizable logos in Bangladesh, as it has been used since the country itself gained independence.

Programming 

Bangladesh Television has a diversified set of programming. It mainly consists of dramas, news, educational, public affairs, talk shows, and others. It also broadcasts sports programming, typically cricket matches. BTV also airs English-language news and entertainment programming, including acquired foreign television series. During its anniversaries, Bangladesh Television broadcasts documentaries regarding the history of the network, such as DIT theke Rampura, which was aired on its 50th anniversary in 2014. The network terrestrially broadcasts from 7'o clock at morning to after 12 midnight. Its Chittagong station broadcasts all day, along with BTV World. BTV, however, also broadcasts all day on satellite and cable television. More than 90% of the programming broadcast on Bangladesh Television is produced by the network itself.

See also

 List of television stations in Bangladesh
 Mass media in Bangladesh

References

External links
 

 
Public television in Bangladesh
Television in Bangladesh
Television channels and stations established in 1964
Mass media in Dhaka
Television channels in Bangladesh
Pakistan Television Corporation
Recipients of the National Film Awards (Bangladesh)
Ministry of Information and Broadcasting (Bangladesh)